DeSoto Site Historic State Park is a Florida state park located in Tallahassee, Florida. The site is intended to initiate research and education on nearly four centuries of recorded history beginning with Hernando de Soto's use of the site as a winter encampment in 1539. There is an exhibit of items found at the site in the Governor Martin House.

A 1998 historical marker at the site reads:

See also

Anhaica
Florida State Parks

References

State parks of Florida
Parks in Tallahassee, Florida
History of Tallahassee, Florida